Amos Bernard Muvengwa Midzi (July 4, 1952 – June 9, 2015) was a Zimbabwean politician who served in the Cabinet successively as Minister of Energy and Power Development and Minister of Mines and Mining Development from 2002 to 2009.

Political career
He served as Zimbabwe Ambassador to Cuba from 1987 to 1993. Later, Midzi was appointed as Ambassador to the United States in 1993, which he served until 1997, before he was a member of the ZANU-PF politburo. He ran as the ZANU-PF candidate for Mayor of Harare, the capital, in March 2002, but was defeated by Elias Mudzuri of the Movement for Democratic Change (MDC). Midzi received 56,796 votes against 262,275 votes for Mudzuri. On August 25, 2002, he was appointed as Minister of Energy and Power Development; subsequently he was appointed as Minister of Mines and Mining Development on February 9, 2004. He has also served as ZANU-PF Chairman for Harare. He was placed on the United States sanctions list in 2003 and remained there until his death.

Midzi was nominated as ZANU-PF's candidate for the House of Assembly seat from Epworth, a suburb of Harare, in the March 2008 parliamentary election. He was defeated by the MDC's Jembere Elias, receiving 4,758 votes against 6,220 votes for Elias.

The Herald reported on January 3, 2009, that Midzi had been dismissed from the Cabinet earlier in the week, along with 11 other ministers, because he no longer held any seat in Parliament.

Reports of Midzi's death on June 9, 2015, were immediately labelled as suicide.

On 9 June 2015, following Midzi's death, it was also reported that foul play was suspected amid reports that his car keys were missing. Later in June 2015, a post-mortem conducted on his body revealed that he had been poisoned and was buried at Glen Forest Memorial Park.

References 

1952 births
2015 deaths
Energy ministers of Zimbabwe
Mining ministers of Zimbabwe
Ambassadors of Zimbabwe to the United States